Faiza J. Saeed is an American attorney in the field of mergers and acquisitions, and the presiding partner of law firm Cravath, Swaine & Moore.

Early life and education
Saeed was born in Walnut Creek, California, and is of Pakistani descent. She majored in molecular biology and economics at University of California, Berkeley, graduating with Highest Distinction and Phi Beta Kappa, in 1987, then attended Harvard Law School, graduating magna cum laude, in 1991.

Career
Saeed joined Cravath, Swaine & Moore in 1991 and became a partner in the firm in 1998. Ms. Saeed is known for her close relationships with such industry titans as Jeff Bewkes, Howard Schultz and Jeffrey Katzenberg, the chief executives of TimeWarner, Starbucks and DreamWorks, respectively. Other clients including Morgan Stanley and Hasbro Inc.

Elected presiding partner at white shoe law firm Cravath in July 2016, Saeed received considerable media attention. According to The Wall Street Journal, Saeed is the first woman to lead Cravath, which traces its origins to 1819. She is also one of few women to lead a New York law firm. The Financial Times noted her election as "a significant moment for the dealmaking industry". Saeed has orchestrated multibillion-dollar deals for notable clients in media, pharmaceuticals, entertainment and other fields.

Boards and affiliations
Saeed is a trustee of NewYork-Presbyterian Hospital and of The Paley Center for Media, a board member of Partnership for New York City and a member of the Council on Foreign Relations.

Honors
She was a "Young Global Leader" at the World Economic Forum in Davos, in 2006, and included on its "Wall Street’s 100 Masters of the New Universe" list by the New York Times. In 2019, she was named to Crain's New York Business biennial list of the "Most Powerful Women in New York". and the Asia Society recognized her as a "Game Changer", describing Saeed as "a trusted advisor to chief executives and entrepreneurs and a leading dealmaker across many industries." The Hollywood Reporter named Saeed to its "Power Lawyers 2020" and "Hollywood's Top Dealmakers of 2020" lists.

References

Living people
Corporate lawyers
Cravath, Swaine & Moore partners
People associated with Fried, Frank, Harris, Shriver & Jacobson
Women in finance
Harvard Law School alumni
20th-century women lawyers
21st-century women lawyers
University of California, Berkeley alumni
American people of Pakistani descent
Year of birth missing (living people)
People from Walnut Creek, California
Asia Game Changer Award winners